Danio is a genus of small freshwater fish in the family Cyprinidae found in South and Southeast Asia, commonly kept in aquaria. They are generally characterised by a pattern of horizontal stripes, rows of spots or vertical bars. Some species have two pairs of long barbels. Species of this genus consume various small aquatic insects, crustaceans and worms.

Taxonomy
The name "danio" comes from the Bangla name dhani, meaning "of the rice field". Danio was described in the early 19th century by Francis Hamilton. Two of the species included by him in the genus, still remain valid—D. dangila and D. rerio. About a century later (1916) and with many more species described in the meantime, the genus was split; the larger species into Danio and the smaller species into the genus Brachydanio. In 1991, though, the two genera were recombined; most larger species formerly within the genus Danio have now been reclassified into the genus Devario. Also, Brachydanio is now a junior synonym of Danio.

Species
There are currently 27 recognized species in this genus:

 Danio absconditus S. O. Kullander & Britz, 2015 (Black-barred danio)
 Danio aesculapii S. O. Kullander & F. Fang, 2009 (Panther danio)
 Danio albolineatus (Blyth, 1860) (Pearl danio)
 Danio annulosus S. O. Kullander, Rahman, Norén & Mollah, 2015
 Danio assamila S. O. Kullander, 2015
 Danio catenatus S. O. Kullander, 2015
 Danio choprae Hora, 1928 (Glowlight danio)
 Danio concatenatus S. O. Kullander, 2015
 Danio dangila (F. Hamilton, 1822) (Moustached danio)
 Danio erythromicron (Annandale, 1918) (Emerald dwarf rasbora)
 Danio feegradei Hora, 1937 (Yoma danio)
 Danio flagrans S. O. Kullander, 2012
 Danio htamanthinus S. O. Kullander & Norén, 2016
 Danio jaintianensis (N. Sen, 2007)
 Danio kerri H. M. Smith, 1931 (Blue danio)
 Danio kyathit F. Fang, 1998
 Danio margaritatus (T. R. Roberts, 2007) (Galaxy rasbora or celestial pearl danio)
 Danio meghalayensis N. Sen & S. C. Dey, 1985 (Meghalaya danio)
 Danio muongthanhensis Nguyen, 2001
 Danio nigrofasciatus (F. Day, 1870) (Spotted danio or dwarf danio)
 Danio quagga S. O. Kullander, T. Y. Liao & F. Fang, 2009
 Danio quangbinhensis Nguyen, Le & Nguyen, 1999 	
 Danio rerio (F. Hamilton, 1822) (Zebra danio or zebrafish)
 Danio roseus F. Fang & Kottelat, 2000 (Rose danio)
 Danio sysphigmatus S. O. Kullander, 2015
 Danio tinwini S. O. Kullander & F. Fang, 2009 (Gold-ring danio)
 Danio trangi Ngo, 2003

References

 
Fish of Southeast Asia
Fish of South Asia
Taxa named by Francis Buchanan-Hamilton